The Dermophiidae are a family of common caecilians.  They are found in Central and South America, and Africa.  Like other caecilians, they superficially resemble worms or snakes.

They are the only viviparous caecilians (species that give birth to live young) with secondary annuli (rings around the body).

Species 

Genus Dermophis 
Dermophis costaricense
Dermophis glandulosus
Dermophis gracilior 	 	 	
Dermophis mexicanus - Mexican burrowing caecilian
Dermophis oaxacae
Dermophis occidentalis
Dermophis parviceps
Genus Geotrypetes – West African caecilians
Geotrypetes angeli
Geotrypetes pseudoangeli
Geotrypetes seraphini, Gaboon caecilian	
Genus Gymnopis – wet forest caecilians
Gymnopis multiplicata
Gymnopis syntrema
Genus Schistometopum – Guinea caecilians
Schistometopum ephele
Schistometopum gregorii
Schistometopum thomense

References

AmphibiaWeb: Information on amphibian biology and conservation. [web application]. 2004. Berkeley, California: AmphibiaWeb. Available: http://amphibiaweb.org/. Retrieved 26 August 2004

 
Amphibian families
Amphibians of Africa
Amphibians of Central America
Amphibians of South America
Taxa named by Edward Harrison Taylor